Daniella Lugassy (born 1982) is an Israeli Opera Soprano singer.

Lugassy was born in Jerusalem, the eldest out of three to father Gil Lugassy, a French-born of Sephardic Jewish| (Moroccan-Jewish ) descent who studied Hematology in Paris, and to mother Pearl, an American Jew who worked as a teacher and as a painter. She grew up in Ashkelon, Israel. Lugassy studied in Thelma Yellin Arts School in Tel Aviv. After her  military service in the Israel Defense Forces (2000–2002), she enrolled to the Tel Aviv University Music academy, where she studied under Tamar Rahum. She performed in many plays in Israel's theatres such as the New Israeli Opera. Lugassy is married to Israeli businessman, Omer Shvilli. Lugassy had gained popularity in the recent years thanks to her YouTube channel.

References

1982 births
21st-century Israeli women opera singers
Living people
Israeli YouTubers
Israeli Sephardi Jews
Israeli Mizrahi Jews
Israeli people of Moroccan-Jewish descent
Israeli people of French-Jewish descent
Israeli people of American-Jewish descent
People from Jerusalem
People from Ashkelon
Jewish Israeli musicians
Jewish women singers